Interpretation Act (with its variations) is a stock short title used for legislation in Australia, Canada, Hong Kong, Malaysia, New Zealand, the Republic of Ireland, Singapore and the United Kingdom relating to interpretation of legislation. The Bill for an Act with this short title will have been known as the Interpretation Bill during its passage through Parliament.

Interpretation Acts may be a generic name either for legislation bearing that short title or for all legislation which relates to interpretation.

List

Australia
 Commonwealth
The Acts Interpretation Act 1901
 States and territories
 Interpretation Act 1967 (ACT)
 Legislation Act 2001 (ACT)
 Interpretation Act 1987 (NSW)
 The Acts Interpretation Act 1931 (Tas.)
 Interpretation of Legislation Act 1984 (Vic.)

Canada
The Interpretation Act, RSC 1985, c I-21

Hong Kong
The General Clauses and Interpretation Ordinance 1966

Republic of Ireland
The Interpretation Act 1923
The Interpretation Act 1937
The Interpretation (Amendment) Act 1993
The Interpretation (Amendment) Act 1997
The Interpretation Act 2005

Malaysia
The Interpretation Acts 1948 and 1967

New Zealand
The Legislation Act 2019 (No 58)

Singapore

United Kingdom
The Interpretation Act 1889
The Laying of Documents Before Parliament (Interpretation) Act 1948
The Interpretation Act 1978

Lord Brougham's Act has been described as an interpretation Act.

Act of the Scottish Parliament
The Interpretation and Legislative Reform (Scotland) Act 2010 (asp 10)

Act of the Parliament of Northern Ireland
The Interpretation Act (Northern Ireland) 1954

Measure of the Church Assembly

The Interpretation Measure 1925

See also
List of short titles

References

Lists of legislation by short title